The Sea Pearl 21 is an American trailerable sailboat or sailing dinghy, that was designed by Ron Johnson as a daysailer and first built in 1982.

The Sea Pearl 21 is a development of, or at least inspired by, the 1929 Herreshoff Carpenter design by L. Francis Herreshoff.

Production
The design was built by Marine Concepts, of Tarpon Springs, Florida, United States, starting 1982, with 415 boats completed, but it is now out of production.

Design
The Sea Pearl 21 is a recreational dinghy or a keelboat, if fitted with the optional ballast tanks holding  of water. The boat is built predominantly of fiberglass, with wood trim and has forward decking. It is a cat rigged ketch, with two unstayed masts. A lug sail rig was optional. The hull has a raked stem; an angled, canoe transom; a transom-hung rudder controlled by a  tiller and a retractable, trunk-mounted centerboard or optionally twin leeboards. It displaces , has positive foam flotation making it unsinkable and can carry  of water ballast, if fitted with the optional tanks. The ballast is drained for road transport.

There is also a trimaran version, with outriggers for stability, giving a  beam and a displacement of  that was first built in 1993.

The boat may be fitted with a small  outboard motor for docking and maneuvering.

The design has two cockpits, an aft, self-draining one and a forward, non-self-draining one. Sleeping accommodations for two people are available in the forward cockpit, under a folding canvas cabin roof and with the removable cockpit thwart stowed.

Operational history
In a 2010 review Steve Henkel wrote, "this little decked-over double-ended cat ketch is said to have its design origins in L. Francis Herreshoff's 'Carpenter,' designed in 1929 ... —though we see only a minor resemblance. The Sea Pearl comes with a tonneau cover for the forward cockpit, which is non-self-bailing, but also can be rigged with an optional 'canvas cabin.' A small steering cockpit aft of the mizzen is self-bailing. The base boat has a centerboard, but optional leeboards are available, as are twin lug rigs and water ballast tanks carrying 360 pounds ... Best features: Foam flotation makes her unsinkable. Split rig (main and mizzen) permit playing with trim, such as flying the sails wing and wing downwind. Being considerably lighter than her comp[etitor]s, she is easier to rig, launch, and retrieve on a ramp. Worst features: Narrow and dory-like, the hull has little initial stability—big crew may be necessary in heavy air to keep her on her feet. Boom vangs, an option, should have been made standard, as they are essential to enjoyable sailing. Though it would be fairly simple, no provision has been made for a third mast position where either the main or the mizzen could be stepped, giving her additional versatility."

In a 2015 review in Boats.com noted, "the Sea Pearl is a double ender along the lines of an old whaleboat. The boat is half-decked with two cockpits and 2 mast Marconi rig. Reefing is simple by just rotating the masts. A handy convertible tent that looks somewhat like a pram hood can cover the forward cockpit area, or can be rolled up when not needed."

See also
List of sailing boat types

References

External links
Photo of a Sea Pearl 21 with Bermuda sails
Photo of a Sea Pearl 21 with lug sails
Shallow-water Beach Cruising in a Small Sailboat (The Sea Pearl 21) in Sail Magazine
The Sea Pearl 21, American Sailing Association

    

Keelboats
Dinghies
1980s sailboat type designs
Sailing yachts
Trailer sailers
Sailboat type designs by Ron Johnson
Sailboat types built by Marine Concepts